Anna-Liisa Kasurinen (née Oksanen; from 1967 to 1989 Piipari; born 8 May 1940 in Kivijärvi) is a Finnish nurse and politician. She served as Deputy Minister of Education from 30 April 1987 to 26 April 1991. She was a member of the Parliament of Finland from 1979 to 1995, representing the Social Democratic Party of Finland (SDP).

References

1940 births
Living people
People from Kivijärvi
Social Democratic Party of Finland politicians
Ministers of Education of Finland
Members of the Parliament of Finland (1979–83)
Members of the Parliament of Finland (1983–87)
Members of the Parliament of Finland (1987–91)
Members of the Parliament of Finland (1991–95)
Women government ministers of Finland
Women members of the Parliament of Finland